The following article presents a summary of the 1906 football (soccer) season in Brazil, which was the 5th season of competitive football in the country.

Campeonato Paulista

Final Standings

Mackenzie abandoned the competition, its matches were canceled and the points in the remaining matches were awarded to the club's opponents. São Paulo Athletic matches were canceled, as the club abandoned the competition.

Germânia declared as the Campeonato Paulista champions.

Campeonato Carioca

Final Standings

Fluminense declared as the Campeonato Carioca champions.

State championship champions

References

 Brazilian competitions at RSSSF

 
Seasons in Brazilian football
Brazil